Shattered Innocence is a 1988 American made for television drama film directed by Sandor Stern and written by Thanet Richard and Sandor Stern. The film stars Jonna Lee, Melinda Dillon, John Pleshette, Kris Kamm, Ben Frank, Dennis Howard, Stephen Schnetzer, Richard Cox and Nadine van der Velde. The film premiered on CBS on March 9, 1988.

Plot
An eighteen year old former Kansas high school cheerleader moves to L.A. upon graduating, becomes a porn actress, and is drugged with cocaine before committing suicide at age twenty. Based on the dramatization of real-life accounts of the late Shauna Grant.

Cast 
Jonna Lee as Pauleen Anderson
Melinda Dillon as Sharon Anderson
John Pleshette as Mel Erman
Kris Kamm as Cory Parker
Ben Frank as Lou Gates
Dennis Howard as Del Anderson
Stephen Schnetzer as Danny Calloway
Richard Cox as Brad Pullman
Nadine van der Velde as Nora 
Randy Hamilton as Vince
Peppi Sanders as Vicki
Melissa Michaelsen as Patricia
Neil Billingsley as Don
Ana Auther as Chrissie
Mark Gluckman as Roy
Traci Davis as Mary Lou
Bob Sorenson as Dave
Kenneth Bridges as Detective
Jody Carter as Mary
Crissy Cummings as Annette
Richard Glover as Phil
Lucky Hayes as Susan
Linda Rae Jurgens as Woman Presenter
Sheila Lane-Limon as Carolyn
Sheila Paige Roth as Maureen
Carrie Schultz as Lisa
Stephen Yoakam as Jerry

References

External links
 

1980s English-language films
1980s American films
1988 television films
1988 films
American drama television films
1988 drama films
CBS network films
Films directed by Sandor Stern